Francis Augustine Thill (October 12, 1893 – May 21, 1957) was an American prelate of the Roman Catholic Church. He served as bishop of the Diocese of Concordia, later becoming the Diocese of Salina, from 1938 until his death in 1957.

Biography

Early life 
Francis Thill was born on October 12, 1893, in Dayton, Ohio, to Bernard and Margaret (née Schele) Thill. After attending the University of Dayton, he entered Mount St. Mary's Seminary of the West at Cincinnati in 1914. As a seminarian, he established and organized the Catholic Students' Mission Crusade to aid missionaries in foreign countries.

Priesthood 
Thill was ordained to the priesthood for the Archdiocese of Cincinnati by Archbishop Henry K. Moeller on February 28, 1920. He then furthered his studies at the Pontifical University of St. Thomas Aquinas in Rome, and toured American missionary outposts in Asia. Upon his return to Ohio, Thill served as professor of oratory at Mount St. Mary's, and became chancellor of the archdiocese (1935) and domestic prelate (1937).

Bishop of Concordia and Salina 
On August 26, 1938, Thill was appointed the fourth bishop of the Diocese of Concordia by Pope Pius XI. He received his episcopal consecration on the following October 28 from Archbishop John T. McNicholas, with Archbishops Francis Beckman and Urban Vehr serving as co-consecrators, at St. Monica's Cathedral in Cincinnati. Thill was installed by Archbishop John J. Glennon in Concordia on November 15, 1938. Despite the lingering effects of the Great Depression, Thill managed to liquidate the diocesan debt of nearly $250,000 in late 1942.

On December 23, 1944, Pope Pius XII moved the episcopal see from Concordia to Salina, Kansas, much to the chagrin of local Catholics.During his tenure, Thill laid the cornerstone for Sacred Heart Cathedral in Salina on June 4, 1951, and later dedicated it on June 6, 1953. He erected or remodeled 25 churches, ten schools, 11 rectories, nine convents, and six chapels. Thill ordained 35 priests and founded the Catholic Youth Organization of Concordia in 1939.

Francis Thill died in Salina on May 21, 1957, at age 63. He is buried at Mount Calvary Cemetery in Salina.

References

1893 births
1957 deaths
University of Dayton alumni
The Athenaeum of Ohio alumni
People from Dayton, Ohio
Roman Catholic Archdiocese of Cincinnati
Roman Catholic bishops of Salina
20th-century Roman Catholic bishops in the United States
People from Concordia, Kansas
Catholics from Ohio